The women's 1500 metre freestyle competition of the swimming events at the 2012 European Aquatics Championships took place May 25 and 26. The heats took place on May 25, the final on May 26.

Records
Prior to the competition, the existing world, European and championship records were as follows.

Results

Heats
12 swimmers participated in 2 heats.

Final
The final was held at 17:02.

References

Women's 1500 m freestyle
European Aquatics Championships
2012 in women's swimming